Ukraine competed at the 1995 Winter Universiade in Jaca, Spain. Ukraine won 4 medals, all of which were bronze.

Medallists

See also
 Ukraine at the 1995 Summer Universiade

References

Sources
 Results

Ukraine at the Winter Universiade
Winter Universiade